Brad Savage (born December 9, 1965) is an American actor and singer best known for his role as Danny in the 1984 movie Red Dawn, for which he received a nomination for the Young Artist Award in the category "Best Young Supporting Actor in a Motion Picture Musical, Comedy, Adventure or Drama".

Life and career
Savage was born in Livonia, Michigan in 1965. His mother, Judy, became a talent agent after Brad began his acting career. His sister, Tracie Savage, is an actor.

While known for Red Dawn, Savage also appeared in many television shows in the 1970s and 1980s, including Salem's Lot, CHiPs, Mork & Mindy, Emergency!, Fantasy Island, and The Love Boat.

He appeared in several other films including Two-Minute Warning; The Apple Dumpling Gang; Echoes of a Summer; No Deposit, No Return; Return from Witch Mountain and Islands in the Stream.

Savage currently plays bass guitar and sings in the celebrity group "Band from TV" with Greg Grunberg, Hugh Laurie, James Denton, Bob Guiney, Bonnie Somerville, and others.

Family
Savage is married to Bronwen R. Craig and has two children. His son, Keaton Savage, is an actor.

Filmography

References

Bibliography
 Holmstrom, John. The Moving Picture Boy: An International Encyclopaedia from 1895 to 1995. Norwich, Michael Russell, 1996, p. 357.

External links
 
 

1965 births
American male child actors
American male film actors
Living people
People from Livonia, Michigan
Male actors from Michigan
20th-century American bass guitarists